David Raven (10 February 1909 - 9 October 1971) is a former English actor who played Major Metcalf in 4,575 London performances of Agatha Christie's play The Mousetrap between 1957 and 1968; this number of performances earned him an entry in The Guinness Book of Records.

References

External links

English male stage actors
1909 births
1971 deaths